William White Harris, Jr. (October 26, 1897 – March 7, 1961) was an American competition swimmer who represented the United States at the 1920 Summer Olympics in Antwerp, Belgium.  Harris competed in the men's 100-meter freestyle, advanced to the final, and received the bronze medal for his third-place finish in 1:03.0.  He also swam in the men's 400-meter freestyle; he advanced to the event semifinal and posted a time of 5:36.0.

References

External links

 

1897 births
1961 deaths
American male freestyle swimmers
Olympic bronze medalists for the United States in swimming
Swimmers from Honolulu
Swimmers at the 1920 Summer Olympics
Medalists at the 1920 Summer Olympics